The 2013 Daytona 500, the 55th running of the event, was held on February 24, 2013, at Daytona International Speedway in Daytona Beach, Florida over 200 laps and  on the 2.5-mile (4 km) asphalt tri-oval. It was the first race of the 2013 Sprint Cup season. Danica Patrick won the pole for the race, becoming the first woman to earn a pole position in NASCAR's highest division. She also achieved the best-ever finish by a woman at the Daytona 500, finishing 8th. Jimmie Johnson, driving for Hendrick Motorsports, won the race, making this his first win of the season and his second win in the "Great American Race" and his first since the 2006 race. His teammate Dale Earnhardt Jr. finished 2nd while Mark Martin, Brad Keselowski, and Ryan Newman rounded out the Top 5.

The race was the final Daytona 500 starts for Mark Martin and Jeff Burton.

Report

Background

Daytona International Speedway is one of  six  superspeedways to hold NASCAR races, the others being Michigan International Speedway, Auto Club Speedway, Indianapolis Motor Speedway, Pocono Raceway and Talladega Superspeedway. The track's turns are banked at 31 degrees, while the front stretch, the location of the finish line, is banked at 18 degrees. Matt Kenseth was the defending race winner. In addition to NASCAR, the track also hosts races of ARCA, AMA Superbike, USCC, SCCA, and Motocross. The track's  infield includes the  Lake Lloyd, which has hosted powerboat racing. The speedway is owned and operated by International Speedway Corporation.

The track was built to host racing that was being held at the former Daytona Beach Road Course and opened with the first Daytona 500 in 1959. The speedway has been renovated three times, with the infield renovated in 2004, and the track repaved in 1978 and 2010.

In preparation for the race, NASCAR held several test sessions on January 10–12, 2013, for teams to test the sixth generation of race cars. Every test session began at 9 a.m. EST, paused between 12 p.m. and 1 p.m. EST, and concluded at 5 p.m. EST. During the first session on the morning of January 10, 2013, thirty-four drivers participated; Kenseth, driving for Joe Gibbs Racing, was quickest with a speed of 192.757 mph while Denny Hamlin had the highest speed of 195.712 mph during the second session in the afternoon.

The third test session, held during the morning of January 11, was led by Jeff Burton after having the highest speed of 194.805 mph. The fourth session was the first session in which multiple drivers were on track to draft, which resulted in a large accident following contact between Dale Earnhardt Jr. and Marcos Ambrose. Following the crash, ten teams left the track because of a shortage of parts for the new car. During that fourth session, held during the afternoon, thirty-two drivers participated with 2011 race winner Trevor Bayne being quickest with a speed of 199.650 mph. During the fifth session, held on the morning of January 12, twenty-one drivers participated; Kenseth was quickest with a speed of 194.062 mph. Greg Biffle was quickest with a speed of 194.936 mph in the final session.

Entry List 
(R) denotes rookie driver
(i) denotes ineligible for drivers points
(W) denotes past 500 winner

Practice and qualifying

Seven practice sessions were held before the race. The first two on February 16 ran 120 minutes and 105 minutes each. The next two on February 20 were 90 minutes each. Two days later, two more 60 minute practice sessions were scheduled. The final practice session was held on February 23. Joey Logano was quickest with a time of 46.057 seconds in the first session, less than one-hundredth of a second faster than Austin Dillon. Danica Patrick was just off Dillon's pace, followed by Paul Menard, Burton and Kasey Kahne. Bayne was seventh, still within two-tenths of Logano's time. In the second practice session, Patrick remained fastest with a time of 45.867 seconds, less than one second quicker than second-placed Tony Stewart. Kyle Busch took third place, ahead of Earnhardt Jr., Jamie McMurray and Bayne.

Forty-five cars were entered for qualifying, but only forty-three raced because of NASCAR's qualifying procedure. Unlike most races during the season, the qualifying session only determined the first two positions, while the rest of the drivers qualified by the 2013 Budweiser Duels.  Patrick clinched her first pole during her Sprint Cup career, with a time of 45.817 seconds, and became the first woman to win the pole position in the Sprint Cup Series. She was joined on the front row of the grid by Jeff Gordon.

Once the qualifying session were completed, Patrick commented, "I was brought up to be the fastest driver, not the fastest girl. That was instilled in me from very young, from the beginning. Then I feel like thriving in those moments, where the pressure's on, has also been a help for me. I also feel like I've been lucky in my career to be with good teams and have good people around me. I don't think any of it would have been possible without that. For those reasons, I've been lucky enough to make history, be the first woman to do many things. I really just hope that I don't stop doing that. We have a lot more history to make. We are excited to do it."

Michael Waltrip was quickest in the third practice with 45.375 seconds, followed by David Ragan, Stewart, Menard and Kyle Busch. Kahne led fourth practice with 45.515 seconds, only one-tenth of a second faster than Greg Biffle. Gordon was third ahead of Patrick and Carl Edwards. Kevin Harvick and Kyle Busch were the winners of the Budweiser Duels. The qualifying grid was finalized with Harvick in third and Kyle Busch fourth. Biffle qualified fifth ahead of Kahne, Juan Pablo Montoya, Dillon, Jimmie Johnson and Clint Bowyer. Drivers who failed to qualify were Mike Bliss and Brian Keselowski.

Aric Almirola was fastest in fifth practice with a 45.699 seconds lap, ahead of Burton, Earnhardt Jr., Bobby Labonte and Michael McDowell. Stewart led the sixth session ahead of Gordon and Patrick. Kahne was next with a  45.711 second lap ahead of Kenseth with 45.827 seconds. Earnhardt's 45.319 seconds topped the final practice session, followed by David Gilliland and Bowyer. Ambrose and Almirola rounded out the first five drivers in the fourth and fifth positions.

Qualifying results

Starting grid

Crash at the DRIVE4COPD 300

On February 23, a 14-car crash in the DRIVE4COPD 300 left 33 spectators injured.  On the final lap of the Nationwide Series race, Regan Smith got turned into the wall while trying to block Brad Keselowski, causing a chain reaction, in which Kyle Larson's car flew into the catch fencing. The impact ripped out its engine on the pathway in between the fence and first row of the grandstands. A tire and some other debris flew over the fence and landed halfway up the stands. "I didn't know what to think. I'm an emotional person and I immediately started to cry. It was very scary. Absolutely scary", a spectator remarked.  Local officials reported that 19 people were taken to the hospital, including two in critical condition, while others were treated on-site at the infield care center.  The incident raised questions about safety at Daytona International Speedway. NASCAR chose to repair the catch fencing overnight and have the Daytona 500 go on as scheduled.

Race

There were 28 lead changes among 14 different drivers. Danica Patrick stayed in the limelight, running in the Top 10 all afternoon.  On lap 90, she passed Michael Waltrip on a restart following a caution, which was brought out for debris, and she became the first woman to lead the Daytona 500.  In total, she led on three separate occasions for a total of 5 laps.

Several pre-race favorites struggled. There were two major wrecks that occurred during the race: The first one was on lap 33. This began when Kyle Busch, heading into turn 1, turned Kasey Kahne into the infield. As the field checked up, a total of 6 more cars were collected: Tony Stewart, Kevin Harvick, Jamie McMurray, Casey Mears, Juan Pablo Montoya, and Brad Keselowski. Later, on lap 136, as cars checked up in front of them in turn 2, Keselowski got turned sideways by Trevor Bayne, who then got sideways himself, came up the track, and collected 7 more cars (totaling nine in all): Austin Dillon, Carl Edwards; Ricky Stenhouse Jr.; David Ragan, David Gilliland, Josh Wise, and Terry Labonte.  Jeff Gordon led the first 31 laps, but soon his car kept overheating and he never threatened the leaders after dropping back on lap 32, finishing 20th. Matt Kenseth led the most laps, at 86, but his day ended on lap 150 with an engine failure.

Jimmie Johnson, racing in his 400th career Sprint Cup start, was back in the field for most of the race. He emerged from the pack with 16 laps to go and seized control with 10 to go, racing past Keselowski on the final restart.  A caution with six laps to go for debris bunched up the field, but Johnson held on staving off a last lap charge by Dale Earnhardt Jr. and Mark Martin.  "I had a lot of confidence those final few laps, leading the train," Johnson said. "I knew just how fast this car was."  Keselowski finished fourth.  Greg Biffle and Danica Patrick had entered the final lap in second and third place respectively before both were shuffled back by Earnhardt and Martin.  Patrick finished eighth, becoming the first woman to finish in the top ten at the Daytona 500.  She blamed inexperience for the late fall, saying "I didn't know what to do, exactly" in the final scramble.  Johnson, however, said that Patrick looked "really comfortable" all race.  "She held a great wheel, was smooth, took advantage of runs when she had them."

Johnson became the sixth driver to win a race in his 400th Sprint Cup start, following Lee Petty, Richard Petty, David Pearson, Dave Marcis, and Dale Earnhardt. It also marked the first NASCAR win for Schuberth.

Race results

Standings after the race

Drivers' Championship standings

Manufacturers' Championship standings

Note: Only the first twelve positions are included for the driver standings.

References

Daytona 500
Daytona 500
Daytona 500
NASCAR races at Daytona International Speedway